Gorgeh Bisheh, also rendered as Gorg-e Bisheh and Gurgbishah, may refer to:
 Gorgeh Bisheh-ye Olya